File Under: Easy Listening (also known as F.U.E.L.) is the second (not counting the EP Beaster) and final studio album by Sugar.

Background
Primary songwriter Bob Mould discussed material written after Beaster in 1993: "It's pretty punk rock. Not real fast, just pretty basic. A lot of it's really vocal-y. Really beautiful and really harmonic, but it's real piledriving… Weird chord changes underneath real traditional vocal lines. So I think it'll be somewhere between these last two records. Also, I'm really starting to hate guitar solos, so I'm trying to avoid them. I'm bending a lot of strings, starting to sound like Johnny Thunders again."

An attempt to record the album in Atlanta proved abortive. "There were seventeen songs done," said Mould. "There were some vocals left to do, and that was it. But it wasn't satisfying me. I erased everything. What are you going to do – keep the tapes on a shelf somewhere? Like you'd ever go into that room again. 'Yes: there is my abject failure.' It's poison – get it out of your life."

Reception

"F.U.E.L. finds former Hüsker Dü man Bob Mould exorcising more demons over a structured barrage of pop noises," observed Steve Lamacq in Q. "The sounds and textures come from the dark, brooding Beaster while the melodies are lifted from the poppier Copper Blue."

"File Under Easy Listening is the kind of title that a third-rate death metal band would come with…" quipped Clark Collis in Select. "Also, there's the production. Where tracks like 'Changes' or 'Hoover Dam' off Copper Blue leapt out of the speakers with all the unrestrained force and tang of a nuclear-powered kipper, most of F.U.E.L. would probably ask your auntie's permission before even turning up… And then, slowly but surely, it all begins to make sense."
The album peaked at #7 in the UK and #32 in Canada.

Track listing

Personnel
 Bob Mould - guitars, vocals
 David Barbe - bass, vocals
 Malcolm Travis - drums
James SK Wān – bamboo flute

Charts

Album

Single

References

External links
Great Expectations for Ryko's 2nd Sugar Album

1994 albums
Sugar (American band) albums
Albums produced by Bob Mould
Rykodisc albums